The 2008–09 Phoenix Suns season was the 41st season of the franchise in the National Basketball Association (NBA). The season was to be a promising one, filled with All-Star talent at several positions. It was believed over the offseason, the Suns would be able to better incorporate Shaquille O'Neal, who necessitated changes to both the offense and defense after being obtained in a trade one season ago. It was also the first season head coach Terry Porter had been able to use the summer to implement his defensive approach for a team which had in seasons past scored a large number of their points off fast breaks and early in the shot clock. Sensing a need for change, team management traded for scorer Jason Richardson in December, but this did not appear to immediately reinvigorate an offense that had recently led the league in points per game. However, after Phoenix went 28–23 to start the season, Suns assistant Alvin Gentry was named to replace Porter as head coach. Less than one week after the All-Star Game, Amar'e Stoudemire sustained a season-ending eye injury while the improvement of the team never fully came. The Suns finished 46–36, second in the Pacific division but out the playoffs for the first time since Steve Nash rejoined the Suns in the 2004–05 season. The Suns had the best team offensive rating in the NBA.

Key dates
 June 26: The 2008 NBA draft took place in New York City.
 July 1: The free agency period started.
 October 1: Starting power forward Amar'e Stoudemire sustained a partially torn iris.
 October 8: The pre-season started with a game against the Atlanta Hawks.
 October 29: The regular season started with a game against the San Antonio Spurs.
 February 14–15: Phoenix hosted the 2009 NBA All-Star Weekend.
 February 16: The Suns fired coach Terry Porter and named Alvin Gentry interim coach.
 February 20: Stoudemire underwent surgery for a detached retina and was out for eight weeks after an injury sustained on February 18.

Offseason

 June 7: Terry Porter was named as the Suns' new head coach.
 June 20: Alvin Gentry, Bill Cartwright, Dan Majerle and Igor Kokoskov were named as the Suns' new assistant coaches.
 June 26: Forward Grant Hill has exercised his player option for the 2008–09 season.
 June 26: Suns have acquired the draft rights to the rookie point guard Goran Dragić from San Antonio Spurs.
 July 10: Suns have signed center Robin Lopez, selected with the 15th overall pick in the 2008 NBA draft.
 July 22: Free agent forward Matt Barnes has signed with the Suns.
 August 14: Free agent forward Louis Amundson has signed with the Suns.
 August 25: Suns have acquired rookie guard Sean Singletary from the Houston Rockets in exchange for guard D. J. Strawberry.
 September 22: Suns have signed Goran Dragić.
 October 23: The Phoenix Suns have exercised the team's option on swingman Alando Tucker for the 2009–10 season.

NBA Draft

Roster

Regular season

Standings

Game log

|- bgcolor="#bbffbb"
| 1
| October 29
| @ San Antonio
| 
| Amar'e Stoudemire (22)
| Shaquille O'Neal (13)
| Steve Nash (13)
| AT&T Center18,797
| 1–0
|- bgcolor="#ffcccc"
| 2
| October 30
| New Orleans
| 
| Steve Nash (24)
| Amar'e Stoudemire (12)
| Steve Nash (9)
| US Airways Center18,422
| 1–1

|- bgcolor="#bbffbb"
| 3
| November 1
| Portland
| 
| Amar'e Stoudemire (23)
| Amar'e Stoudemire (13)
| Steve Nash (7)
| US Airways Center18,422
| 2–1
|- bgcolor="#bbffbb"
| 4
| November 4
| @ New Jersey
| 
| Raja Bell (22)
| Matt Barnes (7)
| Steve Nash (11)
| Izod Center15,230
| 3–1
|- bgcolor="#bbffbb"
| 5
| November 5
| @ Indiana
| 
| Amar'e Stoudemire (49)
| Amar'e Stoudemire (11)
| Amar'e Stoudemire, Steve Nash (6)
| Conseco Fieldhouse11,660
| 4–1
|- bgcolor="#ffcccc"
| 6
| November 7
| @ Chicago
| 
| Amar'e Stoudemire (26)
| Robin Lopez, Amar'e Stoudemire (7)
| Steve Nash (5)
| United Center21,967
| 4–2
|- bgcolor="#bbffbb"
| 7
| November 8
| @ Milwaukee
| 
| Shaquille O'Neal (29)
| Shaquille O'Neal, Grant Hill (11)
| Steve Nash (7)
| Bradley Center17,935
| 5–2
|- bgcolor="#bbffbb"
| 8
| November 10
| Memphis
| 
| Leandro Barbosa (27)
| Matt Barnes (8)
| Steve Nash (6)
| US Airways Center18,422
| 6–2
|- bgcolor="#ffcccc"
| 9
| November 12
| Houston
| 
| Leandro Barbosa, Shaquille O'Neal (18)
| Shaquille O'Neal (13)
| Shaquille O'Neal, Steve Nash (3)
| US Airways Center18,422
| 6–3
|- bgcolor="#bbffbb"
| 10
| November 14
| @ Sacramento
| 
| Shaquille O'Neal (29)
| Shaquille O'Neal (13)
| Shaquille O'Neal (6)
| ARCO Arena12,810
| 7–3
|- bgcolor="#bbffbb"
| 11
| November 16
| Detroit
| 
| Amar'e Stoudemire (29)
| Amar'e Stoudemire (11)
| Steve Nash (7)
| US Airways Center18,422
| 8–3
|- bgcolor="#ffcccc"
| 12
| November 17
| @ Utah
| 
| Amar'e Stoudemire (30)
| Amar'e Stoudemire (8)
| Steve Nash (8)
| EnergySolutions Arena19,911
| 8–4
|- bgcolor="#ffcccc"
| 13
| November 20
| L.A. Lakers
| 
| Amar'e Stoudemire (21)
| Shaquille O'Neal (9)
| Steve Nash (10)
| US Airways Center18,422
| 8–5
|- bgcolor="#bbffbb"
| 14
| November 22
| Portland
| 
| Shaquille O'Neal (19)
| Shaquille O'Neal (17)
| Steve Nash (7)
| US Airways Center18,422
| 9–5
|- bgcolor="#bbffbb"
| 15
| November 25
| @ Oklahoma City
| 
| Amar'e Stoudemire (22)
| Steve Nash (8)
| Steve Nash (15)
| Ford Center19,136
| 10–5
|- bgcolor="#bbffbb"
| 16
| November 26
| @ Minnesota
| 
| Steve Nash (20)
| Shaquille O'Neal (10)
| Steve Nash (6)
| Target Center11,708
| 11–5
|- bgcolor="#ffcccc"
| 17
| November 28
| Miami
| 
| Leandro Barbosa (20)
| Shaquille O'Neal (9)
| Leandro Barbosa (5)
| US Airways Center18,422
| 11–6
|- bgcolor="#ffcccc"
| 18
| November 30
| New Jersey
| 
| Steve Nash (26)
| Amar'e Stoudemire (12)
| Steve Nash (9)
| US Airways Center18,422
| 11–7

|- bgcolor="#ffcccc"
| 19
| December 3
| @ New Orleans
| 
| Amar'e Stoudemire (26)
| Matt Barnes (7)
| Grant Hill (6)
| New Orleans Arena15,804
| 11–8
|- bgcolor="#ffcccc"
| 20
| December 4
| @ Dallas
| 
| Amar'e Stoudemire (28)
| Matt Barnes (6)
| Steve Nash (10)
| American Airlines Center19,813
| 11–9
|- bgcolor="#bbffbb"
| 21
| December 6
| Utah
| 
| Leandro Barbosa (25)
| Amar'e Stoudemire (20)
| Steve Nash (9)
| US Airways Center18,422
| 12–9
|- bgcolor="#bbffbb"
| 22
| December 9
| Milwaukee
| 
| Shaquille O'Neal (35)
| Shaquille O'Neal, Amar'e Stoudemire (8)
| Steve Nash (10)
| US Airways Center18,422
| 13–9
|- bgcolor="#ffcccc"
| 23
| December 10
| @ L.A. Lakers
| 
| Matt Barnes (25)
| Amar'e Stoudemire (11)
| Steve Nash (9)
| Staples Center18,997
| 13–10
|- bgcolor="#bbffbb"
| 24
| December 12
| Orlando
| 
| Jason Richardson, Amar'e Stoudemire, Steve Nash (21)
| Amar'e Stoudemire (14)
| Steve Nash (10)
| US Airways Center18,422
| 14–10
|- bgcolor="#bbffbb"
| 25
| December 15
| New York
| 
| Shaquille O'Neal (23)
| Amar'e Stoudemire (14)
| Steve Nash (6)
| US Airways Center18,422
| 15–10
|- bgcolor="#ffcccc"
| 26
| December 18
| @ Portland
| 
| Amar'e Stoudemire (23)
| Amar'e Stoudemire (8)
| Steve Nash (11)
| Rose Garden20,650
| 15–11
|- bgcolor="#bbffbb"
| 27
| December 20
| Denver
| 
| Amar'e Stoudemire (27)
| Amar'e Stoudemire (10)
| Steve Nash (11)
| US Airways Center18,422
| 16–11
|- bgcolor="#ffcccc"
| 28
| December 25
| San Antonio
| 
| Amar'e Stoudemire (25)
| Amar'e Stoudemire (13)
| Steve Nash (8)
| US Airways Center18,422
| 16–12
|- bgcolor="#bbffbb"
| 29
| December 29
| @ Oklahoma City
| 
| Shaquille O'Neal (28)
| Shaquille O'Neal (12)
| Leandro Barbosa, Amar'e Stoudemire (5)
| Ford Center19,136
| 17–12
|- bgcolor="#bbffbb"
| 30
| December 30
| @ Memphis
| 
| Leandro Barbosa (28)
| Shaquille O'Neal (13)
| Matt Barnes (5)
| FedExForum14,471
| 18–12

|- bgcolor="#bbffbb"
| 31
| January 2
| L.A. Clippers
| 
| Amar'e Stoudemire (23)
| Shaquille O'Neal (9)
| Steve Nash (11)
| US Airways Center18,422
| 19–12
|- bgcolor="#ffcccc"
| 32
| January 7
| Indiana
| 
| Amar'e Stoudemire (23)
| Louis Amundson (14)
| Steve Nash (12)
| US Airways Center18,422
| 19–13
|- bgcolor="#bbffbb"
| 33
| January 9
| Dallas
| 
| Shaquille O'Neal (25)
| Shaquille O'Neal (10)
| Steve Nash (12)
| US Airways Center18,422
| 20–13
|- bgcolor="#bbffbb"
| 34
| January 11
| @ L.A. Clippers
| 
| Amar'e Stoudemire (26)
| Shaquille O'Neal (10)
| Steve Nash (12)
| Staples Center17,307
| 21–13
|- bgcolor="#bbffbb"
| 35
| January 13
| Atlanta
| 
| Shaquille O'Neal (26)
| Matt Barnes, Shaquille O'Neal (10)
| Steve Nash (6)
| US Airways Center18,422
| 22–13
|- bgcolor="#ffcccc"
| 36
| January 15
| @ Denver
| 
| Grant Hill (25)
| Grant Hill, Amar'e Stoudemire (8)
| Steve Nash (14)
| Pepsi Center18,073
| 22–14
|- bgcolor="#ffcccc"
| 37
| January 16
| Minnesota
| 
| Shaquille O'Neal, Leandro Barbosa (22)
| Shaquille O'Neal (11)
| Steve Nash (6)
| US Airways Center18,422
| 22–15
|- bgcolor="#bbffbb"
| 38
| January 18
| @ Toronto
| 
| Amar'e Stoudemire (31)
| Grant Hill (9)
| Steve Nash (18)
| Air Canada Centre19,800
| 23–15
|- bgcolor="#ffcccc"
| 39
| January 19
| @ Boston
| 
| Shaquille O'Neal (16)
| Shaquille O'Neal (11)
| Steve Nash (8)
| TD Banknorth Garden18,624
| 23–16
|- bgcolor="#ffcccc"
| 40
| January 21
| @ New York
| 
| Jason Richardson (27)
| Shaquille O'Neal (12)
| Steve Nash (19)
| Madison Square Garden19,256
| 23–17
|- bgcolor="#ffcccc"
| 41
| January 23
| @ Charlotte
| 
| Shaquille O'Neal (20)
| Amar'e Stoudemire (9)
| Steve Nash (5)
| Time Warner Cable Arena19,104
| 23–18
|- bgcolor="#bbffbb"
| 42
| January 25
| @ Atlanta
| 
| Amar'e Stoudemire (23)
| Shaquille O'Neal (11)
| Steve Nash (13)
| Philips Arena19,153
| 24–18
|- bgcolor="#bbffbb"
| 43
| January 26
| @ Washington
| 
| Shaquille O'Neal (29)
| Amar'e Stoudemire (15)
| Steve Nash (15)
| Verizon Center17,344
| 25–18
|- bgcolor="#ffcccc"
| 44
| January 29
| San Antonio
| 
| Amar'e Stoudemire (28)
| Amar'e Stoudemire, Grant Hill (10)
| Steve Nash (18)
| US Airways Center18,422
| 25–19
|- bgcolor="#ffcccc"
| 45
| January 31
| Chicago
| 
| Leandro Barbosa (32)
| Shaquille O'Neal (8)
| Steve Nash (10)
| US Airways Center18,422
| 25–20

|- bgcolor="#bbffbb"
| 46
| February 2
| Sacramento
| 
| Amar'e Stoudemire (25)
| Shaquille O'Neal (9)
| Steve Nash (9)
| US Airways Center18,422
| 26–20
|- bgcolor="#ffcccc"
| 47
| February 4
| @ Golden State
| 
| Jason Richardson (24)
| Shaquille O'Neal (12)
| Steve Nash (9)
| Oracle Arena19,596
| 26–21
|- bgcolor="#bbffbb"
| 48
| February 6
| Golden State
| 
| Grant Hill (27)
| Amar'e Stoudemire (15)
| Steve Nash (8)
| US Airways Center18,422
| 27–21
|- bgcolor="#bbffbb"
| 49
| February 8
| @ Detroit
| 
| Jason Richardson (21)
| Shaquille O'Neal (10)
| Steve Nash (21)
| The Palace of Auburn Hills22,076
| 28–21
|- bgcolor="#ffcccc"
| 50
| February 9
| @ Philadelphia
| 
| Amar'e Stoudemire (19)
| Shaquille O'Neal (10)
| Steve Nash (8)
| Wachovia Center16,797
| 28–22
|- bgcolor="#ffcccc"
| 51
| February 11
| @ Cleveland
| 
| Amar'e Stoudemire (27)
| Amar'e Stoudemire, Shaquille O'Neal, Matt Barnes (6)
| Leandro Barbosa (7)
| Quicken Loans Arena20,562
| 28–23
|- bgcolor="#bbffbb"
| 52
| February 17
| L.A. Clippers
| 
| Leandro Barbosa (24)
| Matt Barnes (9)
| Steve Nash (10)
| US Airways Center18,422
| 29–23
|- bgcolor="#bbffbb"
| 53
| February 18
| @ L.A. Clippers
| 
| Amar'e Stoudemire (42)
| Amar'e Stoudemire (11)
| Steve Nash (12)
| Staples Center18,169
| 30–23
|- bgcolor="#bbffbb"
| 54
| February 20
| Oklahoma City
| 
| Leandro Barbosa (41)
| Shaquille O'Neal (9)
| Matt Barnes (9)
| US Airways Center18,422
| 31–23
|- bgcolor="#ffcccc"
| 55
| February 22
| Boston
| 
| Jason Richardson (21)
| Shaquille O'Neal (6)
| Steve Nash (11)
| US Airways Center18,422
| 31–24
|- bgcolor="#bbffbb"
| 56
| February 24
| Charlotte
| 
| Steve Nash (22)
| Shaquille O'Neal (11)
| Steve Nash (5)
| US Airways Center18,422
| 32–24
|- bgcolor="#ffcccc"
| 57
| February 26
| @ L.A. Lakers
| 
| Leandro Barbosa (18)
| Jared Dudley (8)
| Leandro Barbosa (7)
| Staples Center18,997
| 32–25
|- bgcolor="#bbffbb"
| 58
| February 27
| Toronto
| 
| Shaquille O'Neal (45)
| Shaquille O'Neal (11)
| Grant Hill (12)
| US Airways Center18,422
| 33–25

|- bgcolor="#bbffbb"
| 59
| March 1
| L.A. Lakers
| 
| Shaquille O'Neal (33)
| Matt Barnes (10)
| Matt Barnes, Leandro Barbosa (7)
| US Airways Center18,422
| 34–25
|- bgcolor="#ffcccc"
| 60
| March 3
| @ Orlando
| 
| Jason Richardson (27)
| Shaquille O'Neal (11)
| Steve Nash (8)
| Amway Arena17,461
| 34–26
|- bgcolor="#ffcccc"
| 61
| March 4
| @ Miami
| 
| Steve Nash (29)
| Shaquille O'Neal (8)
| Steve Nash (10)
| American Airlines Arena19,600
| 34–27
|- bgcolor="#ffcccc"
| 62
| March 6
| @ Houston
| 
| Steve Nash (32)
| Matt Barnes (9)
| Steve Nash (13)
| Toyota Center18,045
| 34–28
|- bgcolor="#ffcccc"
| 63
| March 8
| @ San Antonio
| 
| Steve Nash (23)
| Grant Hill (8)
| Steve Nash (11)
| AT&T Center18,797
| 34–29
|- bgcolor="#ffcccc"
| 64
| March 10
| Dallas
| 
| Steve Nash (23)
| Louis Amundson (9)
| Steve Nash (13)
| US Airways Center18,422
| 34–30
|- bgcolor="#ffcccc"
| 65
| March 12
| Cleveland
| 
| Matt Barnes (21)
| Jason Richardson, Shaquille O'Neal (7)
| Steve Nash (6)
| US Airways Center18,422
| 34–31
|- bgcolor="#bbffbb"
| 66
| March 14
| Oklahoma City
| 
| Leandro Barbosa (22)
| Jared Dudley (9)
| Steve Nash (8)
| US Airways Center18,422
| 35–31
|- bgcolor="#bbffbb"
| 67
| March 15
| @ Golden State
| 
| Jason Richardson (31)
| Grant Hill (8)
| Matt Barnes (11)
| Oracle Arena19,596
| 36–31
|- bgcolor="#bbffbb"
| 68
| March 18
| Philadelphia
| 
| Shaquille O'Neal (26)
| Shaquille O'Neal (11)
| Steve Nash (10)
| US Airways Center18,422
| 37–31
|- bgcolor="#bbffbb"
| 69
| March 21
| Washington
| 
| Jason Richardson (35)
| Stromile Swift (12)
| Jared Dudley (6)
| US Airways Center18,422
| 38–31
|- bgcolor="#bbffbb"
| 70
| March 23
| Denver
| 
| Grant Hill (23)
| Grant Hill (10)
| Steve Nash (9)
| US Airways Center18,422
| 39–31
|- bgcolor="#bbffbb"
| 71
| March 25
| Utah
| 
| Grant Hill (26)
| Shaquille O'Neal (12)
| Steve Nash (14)
| US Airways Center18,422
| 40–31
|- bgcolor="#ffcccc"
| 72
| March 26
| @ Portland
| 
| Shaquille O'Neal (20)
| Shaquille O'Neal (7)
| Steve Nash (5)
| Rose Garden20,650
| 40–32
|- bgcolor="#ffcccc"
| 73
| March 28
| @ Utah
| 
| Steve Nash (20)
| Shaquille O'Neal, Matt Barnes (10)
| Steve Nash (6)
| EnergySolutions Arena19,911
| 40–33
|- bgcolor="#ffcccc"
| 74
| March 29
| @ Sacramento
| 
| Steve Nash (31)
| Jared Dudley (11)
| Steve Nash (14)
| ARCO Arena13,623
| 40–34

|- bgcolor="#bbffbb"
| 75
| April 1
| Houston
| 
| Steve Nash (25)
| Shaquille O'Neal (10)
| Steve Nash (17)
| US Airways Center18,422
| 41–34
|- bgcolor="#bbffbb"
| 76
| April 3
| Sacramento
| 
| Steve Nash (29)
| Matt Barnes (11)
| Steve Nash (9)
| US Airways Center18,422
| 42–34
|- bgcolor="#ffcccc"
| 77
| April 5
| @ Dallas
| 
| Leandro Barbosa (24)
| Shaquille O'Neal (7)
| Steve Nash (8)
| American Airlines Center20,301
| 42–35
|- bgcolor="#bbffbb"
| 78
| April 8
| @ New Orleans
| 
| Steve Nash (24)
| Shaquille O'Neal (11)
| Steve Nash (13)
| New Orleans Arena17,781
| 43–35
|- bgcolor="#ffcccc"
| 79
| April 10
| @ Memphis
| 
| Louis Amundson, Jason Richardson (13)
| Louis Amundson (9)
| Goran Dragić (7)
| FedExForum15,908
| 43–36
|- bgcolor="#bbffbb"
| 80
| April 11
| @ Minnesota
| 
| Grant Hill (19)
| Robin Lopez (11)
| Goran Dragić (8)
| Target Center18,478
| 44–36
|- bgcolor="#bbffbb"
| 81
| April 13
| Memphis
| 
| Shaquille O'Neal (19)
| Jason Richardson, Grant Hill (8)
| Steve Nash (12)
| US Airways Center18,422
| 45–36
|- bgcolor="#bbffbb"
| 82
| April 15
| Golden State
| 
| Grant Hill (27)
| Grant Hill (10)
| Steve Nash (12)
| US Airways Center18,422
| 46–36

Player statistics

Season

|- align="center" bgcolor=""
|  || 76 || 0 || 13.7 || .536 || .000 || .442 || 3.6 || 0.4 || .4 || .9 || 4.2
|- align="center" bgcolor="#f0f0f0"
|  || 70 || 11 || 24.4 || .482 || .375 || .881 || 2.6 || 2.3 || style="background:#FF8800;color:#423189;" | 1.2 || .1 || 14.2
|- align="center" bgcolor=""
|  || 77 || 40 || 27.0 || .423 || .343 || .743 || 5.5 || 2.8 || .7 || .3 || 10.2
|- align="center" bgcolor="#f0f0f0"
| * || 22 || 22 || 32.4 || .429 || .468^ || .762 || 2.9 || 1.3 || .6 || .1 || 9.6
|- align="center" bgcolor=""
| * || 2 || 0 || 14.0 || .200 || .250 || 1.000# || 0.5 || 1.5 || .0 || .0 || 2.5
|- align="center" bgcolor="#f0f0f0"
| * || 22 || 0 || 24.5 || .567 || .357 || .692 || 3.8 || 2.1 || .5 || .4 || 8.3
|- align="center" bgcolor=""
|  || 55 || 1 || 13.2 || .393 || .370 || .769 || 1.9 || 2.0 || .5 || .1 || 4.5
|- align="center" bgcolor="#f0f0f0"
| * || 48 || 0 || 15.2 || .481 || .394 || .691 || 3.0 || 0.8 || .8 || .1 || 5.5
|- align="center" bgcolor=""
|  || style="background:#FF8800;color:#423189;" | 82 || 68 || 29.8 || .523 || .316 || .808 || 4.9 || 2.3 || 1.1 || .7 || 12.0
|- align="center" bgcolor="#f0f0f0"
|  || 60 || 7 || 10.2 || .518 || .000 || .691 || 2.0 || 0.1 || .2 || .7 || 3.2
|- align="center" bgcolor=""
|  || 74 || 74 || style="background:#FF8800;color:#423189;" | 33.6+ || .503 || style="background:#FF8800;color:#423189;" | .439^ || style="background:#FF8800;color:#423189;" | .933# || 3.0 || style="background:#FF8800;color:#423189;" | 9.7 || .7 || .1 || 15.7
|- align="center" bgcolor="#f0f0f0"
|  || 75 || style="background:#FF8800;color:#423189;" | 75 || 30.0 || style="background:#FF8800;color:#423189;" | .609 || .000 || .595 || style="background:#FF8800;color:#423189;" | 8.4 || 1.7 || .7 || style="background:#FF8800;color:#423189;" | 1.4 || style="background:#FF8800;color:#423189;" | 17.8+
|- align="center" bgcolor=""
| * || 58 || 57 || 33.1 || .488 || .383 || .778 || 4.5 || 1.9 || 1.1 || .4 || 16.4
|- align="center" bgcolor="#f0f0f0"
| * || 1 || 0 || 2.0 || . || . || . || 0.0 || 0.0 || .0 || .0 || 2.0
|- align="center" bgcolor=""
| * || 13 || 1 || 9.4 || .324 || .400 || 1.000# || 1.2 || 0.9 || .5 || .0 || 2.6
|- align="center" bgcolor="#f0f0f0"
|  || 53 || 53 || 36.8+ || .539 || .429 || .835 || 8.1 || 2.0 || .9 || 1.1 || 21.4+
|- align="center" bgcolor=""
| * || 13 || 0 || 9.3 || .366 || 1.000^ || .533 || 2.5 || 0.2 || .3 || .5 || 3.0
|- align="center" bgcolor="#f0f0f0"
|  || 30 || 1 || 9.4 || .430 || .348 || .788 || 1.0 || 0.4 || .2 || .0 || 4.6
|}

* – Stats with the Suns.
+ – Minimum 70 games played or 2000 minutes, 1400 points.
^ – Minimum 55 three-pointers made.
# – Minimum 125 free throws made.

Awards and records

Awards
 O'Neal was named to the All-NBA Third Team.

Week/Month
 Stoudemire  was named the NBA Western Conference Player of the Week for Nov. 3-9.
 Stoudemire has been named the recipient of the NBA Community Assist Award for October.

All-Star
 Stoudemire was voted to his 4th NBA All-Star Game as a starter.
 O'Neal was named to his 15th career NBA All-Star Game in 17 seasons.
 O'Neal was named the 2009 NBA All-Star MVP with former teammate Kobe Bryant.

Transactions

Trades

Free agents

Additions

Subtractions

See also
 2008–09 NBA season

References

Phoenix Suns seasons
Phoenix